(born June 8, 1965) is a Japanese nordic combined skier who competed from 1989 to 1991. He won a bronze medal in the 3 x 10 km team event at the 1991 FIS Nordic World Ski Championships in Val di Fiemme. He also competed at the 1988 Winter Olympics.

References

External links 

1965 births
Living people
Japanese male Nordic combined skiers
FIS Nordic World Ski Championships medalists in Nordic combined
Universiade medalists in nordic combined
Universiade silver medalists for Japan
Competitors at the 1987 Winter Universiade
Olympic Nordic combined skiers of Japan
Nordic combined skiers at the 1988 Winter Olympics